Yeh Raaste Hain Pyaar Ke is a 2001 Bollywood romantic drama film. It is a love triangle, directed by Deepak Shivdasani. It stars Ajay Devgn, Preity Zinta and Madhuri Dixit in the lead roles, along with Sunny Deol making a extended special appearance. 

Yeh Raaste Hai Pyaar Ke released on 10th August 2001, directly clashing with Farhan Akhtar's directorial debut Dil Chahta Hai starring Aamir Khan. The film received mixed to negative reviews from critics and performed decently at the box office.

Plot 

Two con artists and car thieves, Vicky (Ajay Devgn) and Sakshi (Preity Zinta), are faced with death when they accidentally kill Bhanwarlal's (Deep Dhillon) brother. Bhanwarlal and his other brother swear to avenge the death of their brother and mistakenly kill Rohit Verma (Ajay Devgn), who is a look-alike of Vicky.

The mistaken identity causes Sakshi to think that Vicky is dead and she is devastated. Meanwhile, unknown to Sakshi and Bhanwarlal, Vicky is alive and reaches Manali where he is constantly confused for Rohit. On discovering Rohit's wealth Vicky realizes that he has hit the jackpot and decides to play along. Soon Rohit's father, Pratap Verma (Vikram Gokhale), arrives home to find Vicky in his bed.

Vicky tries to trick Pratap Verma, but he already knows that Rohit is dead. He convinces Vicky to pose as Rohit for the sake of his daughter-in-law, Neha (Madhuri Dixit) who is in denial/shock to the fact that her husband died on the same day that they got married. He agrees to do the job for money. However, halfway through the job he decides to grab the money and returns to Sakshi. They are about to forget all about Rohit and start a life of their own, when Vicky discovers that he is responsible for Rohit's death since Bhanwarlal meant to kill him and not Rohit. He realizes the debt he owes to Rohit and decides to return, leaving Sakshi once again.

Meanwhile, Sakshi's uncle and aunt try to have her marry to Bhanwarlal's youngest brother. She runs away to Manali to be with Vicky. Vicky at this point can't tell Neha the truth and so tells Sakshi that he can't be with her. Soon, with the arrival of Bhanwarlal and Sakshi's aunt and uncle, the truth unravels. Finally, Neha realizes that her husband is actually dead and she accepts the reality. Vicky and Sakshi get back together. It is implied that Neha may find happiness again and start a new life with her childhood buddy, Sagar (Sunny Deol), who loved her from the beginning.

Cast 
Ajay Devgan as Vicky / Rohit Verma (Dual Role)
Madhuri Dixit as Neha Verma, Rohit's wife
Preity Zinta as Sakshi
Sunny Deol as Sagar, Neha's friend (special appearance)
Kiran Kumar as Ranjan Sharma, Neha's father
Vikram Gokhale as Pratap Verma, Rohit's father 
Deep Dhillon as Bhanwarlal
Smita Jaykar as Aarti Sharma, Neha's mother
Rajeev Verma as Dr. Ashok, Pratap's friend
Shammi as Rohit's grandmother
Lalit Tiwari as Ashok Sharma
Asha Sharma as Mausi
Jayshree T. as Neha's aunt
Mayur as Bhanwarlal's brother
Brij Gopal
Madan Jain as Avinash
Tiku Talsania as Kishanchand Bhagwandas Chellaramani

Reception
Gautam Buragohain of Filmfare wrote that the film "fails to make an impact", although he noted the performances of the three leads, particularly that of Dixit.

Soundtrack

References

External links 
 

2001 films
2000s Hindi-language films
Indian romantic drama films
Films scored by Sanjeev Darshan
2001 romantic drama films
Films directed by Deepak Shivdasani
Films scored by Adnan Sami